The Vyborg HVDC scheme is a system of electricity transmission from the Russian power system to Finland, using high-voltage direct current.  It consists of four 355 MVA (250 MW) back-to-back converter blocks, the first three of which were completed in the early 1980s and the last in January 2001. Much of the original converter equipment has been refurbished or modernised.

History
Electricity transmission from the 330 kV Russian (then the Soviet Union) system to the 400 kV Finnish system started in 1981. As the Russian and Finnish power systems are asynchronous, a direct AC connection was not possible and a HVDC-back-to-back station was needed. It was decided to build the substation near Vyborg in the Leningrad region. The first unit of the substation was commissioned in December 1981 followed by the second unit in the autumn 1982 and the third unit in the summer 1984.  The system was manufactured by the Ministry for Electrotechnical Industry of the USSR. A fourth unit was added in 2001 and the control and protection equipment of the three original poles has subsequently been modernised.
In contrast to most other HVDC plants, its converters did not originally allow bidirectional energy to transfer, but only from Russia to the power grid of Finland. It was also the only back-to-back HVDC system in Russia and the only fully operational HVDC system in Russia, the others having either been shut down (Moscow–Kashira), never completed (Ekibastuz–Tambov) or are operated only at reduced capacity (Volgograd–Donbass).

On 13 May 2022, RAO Nordic released a statement saying they were halting the import of power into Finland due to lack of payment. Power transmission halted at 2200 GMT 13 May 2022.

Technical description

It is connected with the Russian and Finnish high-voltage power systems. The substation is connected to the Russian power system with two 330 kV lines to Vostochnaya substation and with one line to Kamennogorskaya substation. It is connected with Finland with three 400 kV cross-border connections to Yllikkälä (two lines) and Kymi (one line) substations.

The substation consist of four independent, parallel symmetrical monopole (centre-grounded) back-to-back units, each rated 355 MVA and operating with a voltage of ± 85 kV.  
Each pole consists of a single Twelve-pulse bridge at each end and was built using thyristors from the outset.  The first three poles were originally built using small (60 mm) diameter thyristors with three in parallel at each level, but these were later replaced by larger 80 mm thyristors which did not require parallel connection.

The converter transformers are of the relatively unusual single-phase, four-winding arrangement, with a 38.5 kV filter winding on which the tuned filters are connected.  Other high-pass filters are connected directly to the 330 kV or 400 kV AC busbars.
With a total transmission rating of 1000 MW, Vyborg was the world's largest HVDC-back-to-back facility until the 1800 MW Al-Fadhili facility was completed in Saudi Arabia in 2009.

See also
High-voltage direct current
HVDC converter
Moscow–Kashira HVDC transmission system
HVDC Volgograd–Donbass
HVDC Ekibastuz–Centre

References

External links 
 https://web.archive.org/web/20051115135709/http://www.transmission.bpa.gov/cigresc14/Compendium/Vyborg+Pictures.pdf

High-voltage direct current
Converter stations
Transport in Vyborg
Electric power infrastructure in Russia
Energy infrastructure completed in 1984
Energy in the Soviet Union
Finland–Soviet Union relations
Electric power infrastructure in Finland